The A174 is a major road in North Yorkshire, England. It runs from the A19 road at Thornaby-on-Tees, across South Teesside and down the Yorkshire Coast to Whitby. The A174 is the coastal route between Teesside and Whitby; the alternative road, the A171, is described as being the moorland route.

Settlements on the route

From West to east;
Thornaby-on-Tees
Coulby Newham
Tollesby
Marton
Ormesby
Normanby
Eston
Grangetown
Lazenby
Wilton
Yearby
Longbeck
New Marske
Skelton-in-Cleveland
North Skelton
Brotton
Carlin How
Loftus
Easington
Boulby
Hinderwell
Ellerby
Lythe
Sandsend
Whitby

Route description
The route starts at Thornaby Road with a junction on the A1044 road going eastwards towards the A19 road. This section was single carriageway, but it was upgraded as part of the long-term plans for the area. After the junction with the A19, the route cuts across South Teesside taking an east/west cut past Normanby, Ormesby and Eston to a junction with the A1053 road to Grangetown. It is here that it loses its Trunk Road status (this carries on up the A1053), but the dual carriageway A174 continues east towards Yearby before becoming a single carriageway. The route of A1053 and A174, is the preferred route inwards and outwards to and from the A19 for traffic going to and from Teesport.

The road turns south at New Marske before going in a generally south easterly direction towards Whitby. The road at Sandsend was strengthened in 2015 on account of the effect of the sea upon its base. Over £7 million was spent on the road to prevent future erosion issues. The section from Hinderwell through Sandsend along the coast to Whitby is a recommended drive by The Telegraph, which states the road "sweeps down to Whitby".

Bypasses
In February 2001, a  diversion was opened between Skelton-in-Cleveland and Brotton. The new road cost £14.5 million and work had begun in January 1996 and involved building on a 3,000 year old Iron Age fort. At the same time, the old A174 route through Saltburn-by-the-Sea, was downgraded form 'A' road status and money was spent on traffic calming measures.

Proposals have been put forward to widen the road between Yearby and New Marske to dual carriageway status. The dual carriageway ends near Yearby and drivers have been caught speeding along the single carriageway stretch.

Safety
The trunk section of road between Thornaby and Lazenby is noted by the Highway Agency as being in the middle zone for casualties and accidents, with the short spur up to Grangetown (the A1053 road) being in the top zone for casualties and accidents. The roundabout between the A1053 and the A174 is also noted for being an accident blackspot.

References

Sources

External links
A174 on SABRE roads

Roads in Yorkshire
Transport in North Yorkshire